Sursagar Lake, also known as the Chand Talao, is a lake situated in the middle of the city of Vadodara in the state of Gujarat in India. The lake was rebuilt with stone masonry in the 18th century. The water in this lake remains in it for the whole year. A concrete wall surrounds the lake on which the people use to sit.

The construction of the statue started in 1996 and it was completed in 2002. In 2023 on the festival Mahashivratri the statue of Lord Shiva was gilded. The gold plated statue of Lord Shiva has now been officially dedicated to the city and its people. The value of gold itself is about 12 Crore Indian Rupees ($1,449,879.60 as of February 2023) The statue of Shiva is lit with lights on Mahashivratri.

There are many underwater gates in the lake which empty the lake if it overflows. The water from the lake empties in the Vishvamitri River. The lake was used for boating.

In 2023 after the remodeling of the statue and the surroundings boating has been resumed in the lake.

The lake is known for a large number of suicides which occur yearly. Between January and October 2014, 15 suicides were reported to the authorities, who attribute the lake's isolation and seclusion make it a choice destination for suicides.

References

External links 
 Architect who gave Vadodara its character
 Municipal body unaware about decaying infrastructure,water quality at Sursagar
 Rs 24.07cr renewal plan for Sursagar

Lakes of Gujarat
Tourist attractions in Vadodara